Latza is a surname. Notable people with the surname include:

Danny Latza (born 1989), German footballer
Hans Latza (1908–1975), German SS judge

See also
Latz